Ryan Prescott (born 21 January 1989) is an English actor who is currently portraying the role of Ryan Connor on the ITV soap opera Coronation Street. He previously played the role of Flynn Buchanan in fellow ITV soap opera Emmerdale in 2011.

Career
Prescott's first television credit was in Marchlands as Mark Ashburn, before making a guest appearance on Holby City. He then began to appear in the ITV soap opera Emmerdale as Flynn Buchanan. He went on to make brief appearances in The Syndicate, Vampire Academy and Casualty. In 2015 Ryan took over for Khan Bonfils, who died during rehearsals for Dante's Inferno A Modern Telling. in 2017, he then appeared in a documentary on the European Refugee Crisis, Dog Years, as himself. Prescott then began appearing in a recurring role on the BBC daytime soap opera Doctors as Liam Slade, with appearances in 2013 and 2018. Prescott also appeared in a Coca-Cola advertisement in 2013. In 2018, Prescott joined the cast of Coronation Street as Ryan Connor, becoming the third actor to portray the role, replacing Sol Heras.

Filmography

References

External links
 

Male actors from Merseyside
English male soap opera actors
Living people
People from Southport
1989 births